F.C. Kossou Bibó, or commonly known as F.C. Bibó is an Ivorian semi-professional football team based in Kossou, Yamoussoukro, Ivory Coast. Some noteworthy players have come through the academy including Feyenoord's Sekou Cissé, WS Woluwe's Bassilia Sakanoko, UTA Arad's Leoh Digbeu (on loan from CFR Cluj) and Newcastle United's Cheick Tioté.

Bibo
1951 establishments in Ivory Coast
Sport in Yamoussoukro
Association football clubs established in 1951